Drasteria scolopax is a moth of the family Erebidae. It is found in China (Tibet, Qinghai, Gansu) and Russia (Siberia).

References

Drasteria
Moths described in 1892
Moths of Asia